Mario Kägi (born 24 February 1967) is a retired Swiss football midfielder.

References

1967 births
Living people
Swiss men's footballers
BSC Old Boys players
FC La Chaux-de-Fonds players
FC Zürich players
Neuchâtel Xamax FCS players
Association football midfielders
Swiss Super League players